Smiths Grove Baptist Church is a historic church at Main and 5th Streets in Smiths Grove, Kentucky.  It was built in 1898 and added to the National Register of Historic Places in 1979.

It is a cruciform-plan one-and-a-half-story brick church.  "In his arresting composition the designer-builder showed an awareness of the picturesque and even startling effects possible in Gothic styling."

References

Baptist churches in Kentucky
Churches on the National Register of Historic Places in Kentucky
Gothic Revival church buildings in Kentucky
Churches completed in 1898
19th-century Baptist churches in the United States
Churches in Warren County, Kentucky
1898 establishments in Kentucky
National Register of Historic Places in Warren County, Kentucky